Landing Sané (born 19 December 1990) is a French professional basketball player for Élan Béarnais Pau-Orthez for the French Pro A.

Professional career
On 29 September 2017 Sané signed a three-month contract with Pallacanestro Reggiana. On 3 January 2018 he parted ways with Reggiana after averaging 5.4 points and 3.6 rebounds in eight LBA games. The same day, he signed a two-month contract with MoraBanc Andorra.

On 8 August 2019 he signed with Monaco of the LNB Pro A. 

On 1 June 2020 he signed with Orléans Loiret Basket of the French Pro A.

On January 11, 2022, he has signed with Élan Béarnais Pau-Orthez for the French Pro A. On August 31, 2022, he has extended his contract for two more years.

National team career
With the junior national teams of France, Sané played at the 2008 FIBA Europe Under-18 Championship and the 2009 FIBA Under-19 World Championship.

References

External links
 Ligue Nationale de Basket
 EuroCup

1990 births
Living people
AS Monaco Basket players
BC Andorra players
Expatriate basketball people in Andorra
Centers (basketball)
Élan Béarnais players
French expatriate basketball people in Spain
French men's basketball players
HTV Basket players
KK Mornar Bar players
Lega Basket Serie A players
Liga ACB players
Metropolitans 92 players
Pallacanestro Reggiana players
People from Ermont
Sportspeople from Val-d'Oise